The Lloyd Center Tower is an 88-meter (290 foot) tall office tower in the Lloyd District of Portland, Oregon. At 20 stories, it is the tallest building in Oregon East of the Willamette River.

It was designed by John Graham & Associates and was completed in 1981. Companies who have occupied the tower include Durst Buildings Corp., who sold the tower to PacifiCorp in 1994. PacifiCorp sold 50% of the office space in the tower in 1995 to Ashforth Pacific, Inc. A skybridge connects the high-rise to Lloyd Center across Northeast 9th Avenue.

In 2001, the building was given the local and regional Earth Award by the Building Owners and Managers Association. In 2007, Integra Telecom moved their headquarters into some of the upper floors of the Lloyd Center Tower.

See also
Architecture of Portland, Oregon
List of tallest buildings in Portland, Oregon

References

External links 

Emporis entry
Skyscraperpage entry
Ashforth Pacific - Lloyd Center Tower

1981 establishments in Oregon
Lloyd District, Portland, Oregon
Skyscraper office buildings in Portland, Oregon
Office buildings completed in 1981
PacifiCorp
Northeast Portland, Oregon